This article contains the length and list of major conflicts, invasions and wars participated by the United States Armed Forces since its creation in 1775. The longest to date is the War in Afghanistan with about 20 years of duration.

Lengths of U.S. combat forces' participation in wars
War in the context of this list is broadly construed to be a direct armed conflict between organized U.S. military forces and organized forces of (a) belligerent(s).

(Note: Ongoing wars are indicated in bold and with red bars.) 

Sources are found in the main articles of each war, as well as the Associated Press.

See also
United States military deployments
Foreign policy of the United States
United States Department of Defense
Declaration of war by the United States
Military history of the United States
Foreign interventions by the United States
United States Armed Forces
United States military casualties of war
List of wars involving the United States
List of conflicts by duration

Notes

References

Bibliography

Lengths of participation
 
History events